Zena Tsarfin is an American journalist best known as managing editor of the magazines High Times, XXL, and Cracked. As a journalist, her work has appeared in publications including Revolver, Alternative Press, Terrorizer, Guitar World, and Playgirl. She is known for her passion for and knowledge about heavy metal music.

Biography
Zena Tsarfin graduated with dual degrees in journalism and political science from Brooklyn College. While attending college, she entered the publishing industry at 19 as an intern for the magazine High Times. She later returned to High Times, serving as the magazine's managing editor until 2001 and then again from March 2006 to January 2007. From 2014 to 2016, Tsarfin wasHigh Times' director of digital media.

Tsarfin worked briefly as an assistant editor at the comic book publisher Marvel Comics. From 2001 to 2005, she served as managing editor of the hip-hop magazine XXL. In June 2005, she was named managing editor of satiric humor magazine CRACKED. In January 2007, she became managing editor of the Atlanta, Georgia-based Web site at SuperDeluxe.com, Turner Broadcasting's online comedy network. Tsarfin was iHeartMedia's Digital Content Director from 2010-2014.

References

External links 
 

Year of birth missing (living people)
Living people
American women journalists
Brooklyn College alumni
21st-century American women